Milorad Zečević (Serbian Cyrillic: Милорад Зечевић; born 26 October 1972) is a Serbian football manager and former player.

Career
Born in Paris, Zečević started out at Paris FC. He later moved to his parents' homeland to play for Proleter Zrenjanin and Loznica. In 1998, Zečević had a brief stint with FF Jaro in Finland, before returning to Proleter Zrenjanin.

In the summer of 2000, Zečević signed with Sartid Smederevo. He spent the following 10 seasons with the Oklopnici, making over 200 appearances in the top flight of Serbian football. In May 2003, Zečević was a member of the team that won the Serbia and Montenegro Cup.

Statistics

Honours
Sartid Smederevo
 Serbia and Montenegro Cup: 2002–03

References

External links
 
 

Association football forwards
Expatriate footballers in Finland
FF Jaro players
First League of Serbia and Montenegro players
FK Loznica players
FK Proleter Zrenjanin players
FK Smederevo players
Serbian expatriate footballers
Serbian expatriate sportspeople in Finland
Serbian First League players
Serbian footballers
Serbian SuperLiga players
Footballers from Paris
Veikkausliiga players
1972 births
Living people